Anh Does... is a travel and lifestyle show presented by comedian Anh Do on the Seven Network. It premiered in 2012 with the two-part series Anh Does Vietnam, in which he revisited the country of his birth, Vietnam. Anh's family fled from Vietnam to Australia as refugees in 1980.

This series was followed by Anh Does Britain in 2013 where Anh visited Great Britain and Ireland and continued with other destinations.

Series overview

Countries

Anh Does... Vietnam (2012)
Anh traveled the country of Vietnam.

Anh Does... Britain (2013)
Anh traveled the country of Britain, including Great Britain & Ireland

Anh Does... Scandinavia (2014)
Anh traveled the country of Scandinavia, including the countries of Denmark, Sweden & Norway

Anh Does... Iceland (2014)
Anh traveled the country of Iceland.

Anh Does... Brazil (2014)
Anh traveled the country of Brazil.

Anh Does... Italy (2015)
Anh traveled the country of Italy.

References

Seven Network original programming
Australian non-fiction television series
2012 Australian television series debuts
2015 Australian television series endings
Television series by Seven Productions